Persatuan Sepak Bola Indonesia Kediri or Indonesian Football Association of Kediri (abbreviated Persik Kediri) is an Indonesian professional football club based in Kediri, East Java, Indonesia. They currently compete in the Liga 1. The club was founded in 1950 and is headquartered in Brawijaya Stadium the city of Kediri.

Persik Kediri started playing in Premier Division Indonesian League (now Liga 1) in 2003. The team with the nickname White Tiger and has a proud motto of Djajati or Panjalu Jayati which means Kediri Wins taken from Hantang inscription. The story of the victory of Kediri Kingdom with its famous king at that time Jayabaya over Janggala, became a spark of enthusiasm and a hope for peach to always strive for victory in every match. Persik Kediri is identical to the majesty jersey in purple.

History

Early formed 
In terms of football Kediri has quite a long history. The beginning of the emergence of the sport football in Kediri started with the opening of Dutch factories that employed Dutch people, it was they who brought football far into the interior like Kediri.During the colonial period, economic conditions in Kediri were controlled by the Dutch, for the economic sector Kediri was indeed famous for its sugar production. With the establishment of many sugar factories in the Kediri area by the Dutch, it also had an influence in various aspects, one of which was sports. And one of the most developed sports in Kediri is football. After the construction of the PG.Meritjan sugar factory in 1918, Dutch employees also entered Kediri. At first the people of Kediri were just spectators when the sport of football was played by employees PG.Meritjan. These employees often do sparring and when their team members are lacking they often ask the audience to play along. This was the beginning of the people of Kediri getting to know the game of football. Since the arrival of football in Kediri, local people have started to like this sport. Initially the Kediri people only played football when the Dutch held a soccer match, but over time the Kediri people began to play it alone without the presence of the Dutch. Football is a sport that is easily accepted by the people of Kediri because this sport is easy to play and this sport emphasizes teamwork. Football seems to be a culture among the people, football in Kediri began to develop with the emergence of soccer clubs in the Kediri area. Not only small clubs that appeared in several areas of Kediri, but in 1950 the association football club was established in Kediri, namely Persik.

In the archives of the management, the Indonesian Football Association of Kediri (abbreviated PERSIK) was established in 1950. As the founder was the Regent of Kediri, R. Muhammad Machin. At that time, Kediri was still a district, there was no separation of regions, districts, and cities. With the help of Kusni and Liem Giok Djie, he first designed the team's flag which was composed of two colors. The top is red and the bottom is black with the words KEDIRI in the middle of the two colors.

Crest  
The Persik Kediri logo is in the shape of a pentagon with red and black background colors. Inside the pentagon there are two yellow gates. This symbolizes the glory of Kediri Kingdom in the past. It was explained that the Kediri kingdom was very broad and rich, at that time in the world the richest countries apart from China sequentially were; Abbasid caliphate which ruled over Arab, Panjalu which controlled the eastern part of the archipelago and Srivijaya which controlled the western part of the archipelago.    Between the two gates in the logo there is a flower symbol taken from the PSSI logo, indicating that Persik Kediri is a member of the Indonesian Football Association. Above the image of the gate is the inscription PERSIK, as the name of the team and the inscription KEDIRI below the image of the gate, indicating the city of origin of this club. This peach logo is the fruit of a design by a Kediri artist named Harsono. He is also known as a teacher in this town. The peach logo is used until now and has not changed.
The nickname of the White Tiger that is pinned refers to the symbol of the Kediri city government. The White Tiger is believed to be the incarnation of King Jayabaya, which until now has become a symbol of the fame of the Land of Kediri. Jayabaya was the fifth king of the Kediri Kingdoms well as the most influential king in Javanese civilization.

The era 

Persik Kediri is entitled to a ticket to play in Asian Champions League 2007 after winning Indonesian League in 2006. The Indonesian League champions were immediately confronted by three strong Asian teams. The three teams are Urawa Red Diamonds (Japan), Sydney FC (Australia), and Shanghai Shenhua (China). Persik was able to make it difficult for the club labeled as the Asian giant by putting up a fight to beat Sydney FC (2–1) and Shanghai Shenhua (1–0) at home which was then located at Manahan Stadium. In the last home match against Urawa Red Diamonds, Persik Kediri were able to force the Japanese representative to draw, Persik Kediri really gave a fierce resistance by winning 2–1 in the first half through a brace Cristian Gonzales but in the end it was equalized and ended with a score of 3–3. These results had opened Persik Kediri's hopes to qualify for the next round on the condition that they must win at home to Shanghai Shenhua. Unfortunately, in the end, Persik Kediri were eliminated due to a crushing defeat in Shanghai (0–6), Meanwhile, Urawa Red Diamonds managed to win the 2007 Asian Champions League. The failure of Persik Kediri, which at that time was strengthened by Cristian Gonazales, Ronald Fagundez, and Danilo Fernando, to qualify from the group stage because they always lost away. Even so, Persik Kediri recorded an achievement by being unbeaten at home and forced to draw with the prospective Asian championship champions.

The club was founded on 19 May 1950 by Raden Muchamad Machin, T.H.D. Rahmat, and M. Sanusi. Since the Liga Indonesia started in 1994, Persik has won (2003) and (2006) editions respectively. The club promoted to the top-tier level in (2002). In the East Java, Persik Kediri has a great name, the team was famous football club also with Arema, and Persebaya, which used to be the best derbies in East Java. The supporters of this club are called Persik Mania of Man & Persik Nona of Woman.

Players

Current squad

Out on loan

Stadium  
Brawijaya Stadium is home to the Persik Kediri team. filed in the middle of Kediri City, East Java. This stadium was built in 1983, and underwent improvements in 2000. Brawijaya Stadium has a seating capacity of 20,000. Brawijaya Stadium is the pride of the people of Kediri because it is in this stadium that Persik Kediri entertains its opponents.

Mascots 
Persik Kediri has Mapu, short for the name Macan Putih (White Tiger). He is the team's mascot who always appears in every match. Mapu was first introduced at the club launching at Brawijaya Stadium in March 2017. When he appeared at the stadium, Mapu became entertainment for both male and female audiences, and has a special place in the fans' hearts. Especially for those who often bring children to the stadium.

Asian club ranking

Asian competition 
2 times participation
 Asian Champions League
 2004: Group stage
 2007: Group stage

Season to season record

Top Scorer List

Club officials

League & cup record

Honours 
 Division Two Indonesian League 2000 – Champion Division Two (Liga 3) (promotion to Division One Indonesian League / Liga 2)
 Division One Indonesian League 2002 – Champion Division One (Liga 2) (promotion to Indonesian League Premier Division / Liga 1)
 Indonesian League Premier Division 2003 – Champion Indonesian League (now Liga 1)
 Indonesian League Premier Division 2006 – Champion Indonesian League (now Liga 1)
 Indonesian League Main Division 2013 – Third place in Main Division (promotion to Indonesian Super League / Liga 1) 2014
 Liga 3 2018 – Champion Liga 3 (Promotion to Liga 2) 2019
 Liga 2 2019 – Champion Liga 2 (Promotion to Liga 1) 2020

Tournament 
 Champion of East Java I Governor's Cup 2002
 Champion of East Java III Governor's Cup 2004
 Champion of East Java V Governor's Cup 2006
 Champion of East Java VI Governor's Cup 2008
 Champion of East Java XII Governor's Cup 2014
 Third Place Indonesian Cup 2010
 Runner-up Bangyos Cup 2005
 Fairplay Team, Best Player, Top Scorer Liga 3 2018
  Trofeo Ronaldhinho 
 Winners : 2022,

(Asian competitions) 
 AFC Champions League
2004 – Group stage 3rd place
2007 – Group stage 3rd place

Kit suppliers 

  Lotto (2008–2010)
  Specs (2010–2012)
  Made by club (2013 & 2016)
  Joma (2014)
  Rabona (2017)
  Fitsee (2018)
  MBB Apparel (2015, 2019–2020)
  Noij Sportwear (2020–2022)
  DJ Sportwear (2022–)

References

External links
 

 
Football clubs in Indonesia
Football clubs in East Java
Indonesian Premier Division winners
Association football clubs established in 1950
1950 establishments in Indonesia